This is a list of museums in Serbia.

Belgrade

Historical Museum of Serbia
House of Jevrem Grujic, (Svetogorska 17)

Elsewhere
The Gallery of Fine Arts – Gift Collection of Rajko Mamuzić
Museum in Loznica
Museum of Vojvodina
The Pavle Beljanski Memorial Collection
Šumarice Memorial Park

See also 

 List of museums
 Tourism in Serbia
 Culture of Serbia

Museums
 
Serbia
Museums
Museums
Serbia